Abilene Municipal Airport  is a city-owned public airport located one mile southwest of Abilene, in Dickinson County, Kansas, United States.

Facilities
For the 12-month period ending September 12, 2007, the airport had 35,800 aircraft operations, average 98 per day: 98% general aviation, 1% air taxi and 1% military. 21 aircraft are based at the airport: 95% single-engine and 5% multi-engine.

The Kansas State University Parachute Club has operated at the airport most weekends since 2012, offering tandem skydives and solo skydive training.

References

External links 
  
 

Airports in Kansas
Buildings and structures in Dickinson County, Kansas